The Tularosa River is a stream in Catron County, New Mexico, United States. It is a tributary of the San Francisco River.

See also

 List of rivers in New Mexico

References

External links

Rivers of Catron County, New Mexico